The Rivière des Grands Méchins Ouest is a tributary of the west bank of the Rivière des Grands Méchins, which flows north to the southern coast of the Saint Lawrence River where it flows into the municipality Les Méchins.

The Grands Méchins Ouest river flows northeast in the Chic-Choc Mountains, in the township of Dalibaire, in the municipality Les Méchins, in the La Matanie Regional County Municipality (MRC), in the administrative region of Bas-Saint-Laurent, in Quebec, in Canada.

Geography 
The Grands Méchins Ouest river takes its source from a small lake located northeast of the "Lacs des Petits Chic-Chocs", and from mountain streams located in the western part of Dalibaire township, in the Chic-Choc Mountains, in the Gaspé peninsula.

From its source, the Grands Méchins Ouest river flows over  divided into the following segments:
  north-east in Dalibaire township, to the confluence of a stream coming from the south-west;
  towards the northeast in a deep valley, up to the confluence of a stream coming from the west;
  northeasterly in a deep valley, to its confluence.

The Grands Méchins Ouest River flows on the west bank of the rivière des Grands Méchins, i.e.  south of route 132.

Toponymy 

The term Méchin constitutes a family name of French origin.

The toponym Rivière des Grands Méchins Ouest was made official on December 5, 1968, at the Commission de toponymie du Québec.

See also 

 List of rivers of Quebec

References 

Rivers of Gaspésie–Îles-de-la-Madeleine
Rivers of Bas-Saint-Laurent